The 1994 Belarusian Extraliga season was the second season of the Belarusian Extraliga, the top level of ice hockey in Belarus. Five teams participated in the league, and Tivali Minsk won the championship.

Standings

External links 
 Season on hockeyarchives.info

Belarusian Extraleague
Belarusian Extraleague seasons
Extra